Life Turns Electric is the fifth studio album by Canadian alternative rock band Finger Eleven. It was released by Wind-up Records on October 5, 2010 and was the last studio album to feature drummer Rich Beddoe. It was nominated for Rock Album of the Year at the 2011 Juno Awards. The track "Living in a Dream" is the official theme song for the 2011 WWE Royal Rumble.

Track listing
All songs written by Finger Eleven; track 4 written by Finger Eleven and Gregg Wattenberg.

Chart positions

Personnel

Band
 Scott Anderson – vocals
 James Black – guitar, vocals
 Rick Jackett – guitar
 Sean Anderson – bass
 Rich Beddoe – drums

Production
 James Black – production, art direction
 Rick Jackett – production
 Ross Petersen – engineering, editing, production
 Chris Lord-Alge – mixing
 John Alicastro – assistant engineering
 Keith Armstrong – assistant engineering
 Nik Karpen – assistant engineering
 Brad Townsend – mixing
 Andrew Schubert – mixing
 Ryan Smith – mastering
 Gregg Wattenberg – production on "Living in a Dream"
 Rich Costey – mixing on "Living in a Dream"
 Charles L. Stavish Jr. – mixing on "Living in a Dream"
 Ted Jensen – mastering on "Living in a Dream"
 Mike Mongillo – concept art
 Michelle Lukianovich – concept art

References

2010 albums
Finger Eleven albums
Wind-up Records albums